Michael Hordern (3 October 1911 — 2 May 1995) was an English actor whose career spanned seven decades. He made more than 160 film appearances, usually in supporting character roles, and appeared in over 100 theatrical productions, most of them Shakespeare.

Stage credits
Hordern appeared as an amateur for several seasons at the St Pancras People's Theatre, while working at the Educational Supply Association, before he turned professional in 1937.

Filmography

Television

Radio broadcasts

References

Citations

Sources

External links
 Michael Hordern at the BFI
 
 
 

Male actor filmographies
British filmographies